Arminio may refer to:
Arminio, an opera composed by George Frideric Handel
Arminio (Biber), an opera composed by Heinrich Ignaz Franz Biber
Arminio Fraga (born 1957), Brazilian economist
Fulgenzio Arminio Monforte (1620–1680), Italian Roman Catholic prelate
Gilberto Arminio de Almeida Rêgo (1895–1970), Brazilian football referee